The Busan Modern History Museum is a museum in Busan, South Korea.

The building was originally constructed during the Japanese occupation of Korea for the Oriental Development Company an organisation used to support Japanese colonization of Korea. Following the liberation of Korea in 1945 it was later used as the United States Information Service and was the site of the Busan American Cultural Service building arson during student protests in 1982.

References

External links

 

Museums in Busan
History museums in South Korea